The Ministry of Gender Equality, Child Development and Family Welfare is a cabinet-level division of the Government of Mauritius. , the Minister of Gender Equality and Family Welfare is Kalpana Devi Koonjoo-Shah.

Name
The department has been known under several different names, including:
Ministry of Gender Equality and Family Welfare
Ministry of Women's Rights, Child Development and Family Welfare

Ministers

In 1991, Sheilabai Bappoo began serving as Minister for Women's Rights, Child Development and Family Welfare. She left the ministry in 1995.

From September 2000 until July 2005, Marie Arianne Navarre-Marie served as Minister of Women’s Rights, Child Development & Family Welfare.

The position was held by Bappoo as the Minister of Gender Equality, Child Development and Family Welfare from May 2010 until August 2011, when she was succeeded by Maria Francesca Mireille Martin until December 2014. Marie Aurore Marie-Joyce Perraud then served as minister until December 2016.

The position was held by Fazila Jeewa-Daureeawoo from January 2017 until November that same year. She was succeeded by lawyer Roubina Jadoo-Jaunbocus, however, she was removed from the position in July 2018 after an inquiry accused her of meeting with jailed drug traffickers who were not her clients. Jeewa-Daureeawoo took up the position again, and remained Minister until November 2019.

In November 2019, Kalpana Devi Koonjoo-Shah was appointed Minister of Gender Equality and Family Welfare.

List of ministers

References

Gender equality ministries
Children, young people and families ministries
Government ministries of Mauritius
Women's rights in Mauritius